Anita Ruth Neville  (born July 22, 1942) is a Canadian politician from Manitoba, who has served as the province's 26th lieutenant governor since 2022. She was elected to the House of Commons of Canada as a Liberal in the general election of 2000. She was re-elected in 2004, 2006, and 2008. After serving for more than ten years, she lost her seat in the election of 2011.

Neville is the first Jewish lieutenant governor of Manitoba and the third who is female.

Early life and career
Neville was born in Winnipeg, Manitoba. She earned a Bachelor of Arts degree in political science from the University of Manitoba. Before entering political life, Neville worked as an economic development consultant for the province of Manitoba. She was a director of Workforce 2000 and the Winnipeg Core Area Initiative and Employment Training Program, and has also been involved in the Law Society of Manitoba and the Winnipeg Jewish Child and Family organization. During the 1990s, she was a member of the Canadian delegation which was responsible for monitoring elections in post-war Bosnia and Herzegovina.

Neville was for several years a school trustee on the Winnipeg School Board, representing Ward One in the Winnipeg School Division from 1986 to 2000. Neville regularly topped the poll in her three-member constituency. She served as Chair of the Board for five years (1987–1989; 1996–1998), and also chaired its finance committee for some time.

Federal politics
In the 1995 provincial election in Manitoba, Neville was a Liberal candidate in the upscale west-central Winnipeg riding of River Heights. This riding is usually considered as one of the few safe seats for the provincial Liberals, and was previously held by party leader Sharon Carstairs prior to her appointment to the Senate of Canada in 1994. Amid an ongoing drop in support for the Liberals, however, Neville came second with 4,435 votes, whereas Progressive Conservative candidate Mike Radcliffe got 5,429.

Later in 1995, Neville was re-elected as a Winnipeg school trustee, finishing in first place in Ward One with 13,828 votes. In the 1999 election, she chaired the successful campaign of provincial Liberal leader Jon Gerrard in River Heights.

In the 2000 federal election, Neville was the Liberal nominee for the Winnipeg South Centre district, previously held by the retiring Lloyd Axworthy. She was elected with 15,231 votes, against 10,675 for her nearest competitor, Progressive Conservative David Newman. This contest was notable for a controversy involving Canadian Alliance candidate Betty Granger, who made comments about Asian students that many interpreted as racist.

In the 2004 election, following substantial boundary reassignments, Neville was re-elected with 18,133 votes against 10,516 for Conservative candidate Raj Joshi.

In 2008, Neville was re-elected with 16,438 votes (42.3%) against 14,103 (36.3%) for Conservative Party candidate Trevor Kennerd, 5,490 (14.1%) for New Democratic Party candidate Rachel Heinrichs, and 2,860 (7.4%) for Green Party candidate Vere Scott.

During Paul Martin's time as prime minister, Neville served as the Parliamentary Secretary to the Minister of Canadian Heritage. She has also served as the Official Opposition Critic for Indigenous Affairs.

In the 2011 election, Neville lost to Conservative Joyce Bateman by 696 votes.

Political interests
Neville was the Official Opposition Critic for the Status of Women, and was a member of the Standing Committee on the Status of Women and the Standing Committee on Aboriginal Affairs and Northern Development.

During her time in Parliament, Neville was a prominent Liberal supporter of Israel and co-chaired of the Liberal Parliamentarians for Israel with Senator David Smith. She was also a vocal opponent of the war with Iraq in early 2003 and was a leading opponent of the proposed American Missile Defense Shield. She has also supported numerous initiatives in the Indigenous community and supported the legalization of same-sex marriage in 2005.

Electoral history

References

External links
Anita Neville

1942 births
Living people
Jewish Canadian politicians
Lieutenant Governors of Manitoba
Liberal Party of Canada MPs
Women members of the House of Commons of Canada
Members of the House of Commons of Canada from Manitoba
Politicians from Winnipeg
University of Manitoba alumni
Women in Manitoba politics
21st-century Canadian politicians
21st-century Canadian women politicians
Jewish women politicians
Canadian women viceroys
Members of the Order of Manitoba
Members of the King's Privy Council for Canada